Afif Chaya is a Lebanese  singer and actor.

Discography 
Aalanet El Hob. 1980
Al Amira. 1984
whyn Hal Turkat. 1985
Al Donya Um

Filmography

Film

Television 
The Sad Night Solo. 2015
The Old Love. 2011
Al Armala W Al Shaytan. 2011
Another Face For Love. 2007
Khataya Saghira. 2005
A Man From The Past - Nabil Wahbi. 2004
My Grandma's Stories. 1984
Izz ad-Din al-Qassam - Salem voice

Plays 
You are the Case

References

External links

1947 births
Living people
Lebanese male actors
20th-century Lebanese male singers
Lebanese male voice actors
20th-century Lebanese male actors
21st-century Lebanese male actors